Tough Love: Co-Ed (season 6) is the sixth season of the American reality television series Tough Love, which first aired on VH1. The show features four men and four women seeking relationship advice from the host and matchmaker, Steven Ward, and his sister Monica Ward, both of the Philadelphia-based Master Matchmakers.

Boot Campers

References

External sources
 MasterMatchmakers.com

2013 American television seasons
2010s American reality television series
VH1 original programming